Paul Geun-Sang Kim (also Keun-Sang and similar; born 1952) is an Anglican bishop of the Diocese of Seoul and the former Primate of the Province of Korea.

He was ordained in 1980 and was elected bishop in January 2008, to take the place of the soon-to-retire, Primate of Korea & Bishop of Seoul Francis Kyung Jo Park. He was consecrated on May 27, 2008 and succeeded Bishop Francis on January 15, 2009. In 2010, to succeed the Primate of Korea, Solomon Jong Mo Yoon, he was elected Primate of the Province of Korea.

References

External links
bishop.cathedral 
skh.or (Korean)

Living people
Anglican archbishops in Asia
South Korean Anglicans
South Korean clergy
1952 births
Anglican bishops of Seoul
Anglican archbishops of Korea